Champhai district is one of the eleven districts of Mizoram state in India. The district is bounded on the north by Churachandpur district of Manipur state, on the west by Saitual and Serchhip districts, and on the south and east by Myanmar. Champhai town is the administrative headquarters of the district.

Geography

Climate
Champhai district has a moderate climate. In winter the temperature varies from 0 °C to 20 °C and in summer, the temperature varies between 15 °C and 30 °C. Manipur is situated to the north of this district, Aizawl district and Serchhip district to the west and Myanmar to the south and east.

Divisions
The district is divided into four tehsils: Khawzawl, Khawbung, Ngopa, and a portion of East Lungdar tehsil.  It has two Rural Development Blocks: Champhai and Khawbung.  The district has five Legislative Assembly constituencies. These are Champhai North, East Tuipui, Lengteng, Tuichang, and Champhai South. There are eighty-eight inhabited villages in this district, seventy-six of which are revenue villages.

Demographics

According to the 2011 census Champhai district has a population of 125,745, roughly equal to the nation of Grenada. This gives it a ranking of 610th in India (out of a total of 640). Its population growth rate over the decade 2001-2011 was 16.01%. Champhai has a sex ratio of 984 females for every 1000 males, and a literacy rate of 95.91%.

The major religious groups in this district include Christians (105,061), Hindus (2,248) and Muslims (432).

Flora and fauna

References

External links

 Champhai district website
Champhai District

 
Districts of Mizoram